Biosteres is a genus of wasps belonging to the family Braconidae.

The genus was first described by Förster in 1862.

The genus has almost cosmopolitan distribution.

Species:
 Biosteres carbonarius
 Biosteres wesmaelii

References

Braconidae
Braconidae genera